Caleb Truax (born September 14, 1983) is an American professional boxer. He held the IBF super middleweight title from 2017 to 2018 and challenged once for the WBA (Regular) middleweight title in 2015.

Personal life
Truax is a native of Osseo, Minnesota. He has a twin sister, Erin Truax, and a younger brother, Seth Martinez.

Truax is a 2002 graduate of Osseo Senior High School. While attending high school, he was an all-conference member of the Osseo Orioles football and baseball teams.

Truax then played football at Virginia State University for one year before a knee injury ended his gridiron career. He returned home in 2003 to attend the University of Minnesota, and it was there at the age of 19 that Truax entered a local Toughman contest. He lost his first fight, but soon became consumed by boxing—altering his diet and training as he pursued an amateur career.

Truax graduated from the University of Minnesota majoring in Sociology, minoring in both African American studies and Political Science.

Amateur career
Truax compiled a record of 21 wins and 8 losses. In 2006 he was the USA Boxing State Champion, the Region 1 Champion, and the Upper Midwest Golden Gloves Champion.

Professional career
Caleb Truax debuted as a professional fighter in April 2007 with a 2nd-round knockout of Ray Walker. As of March 2015, Truax has a professional record of 25 wins, one loss, and two draws. Truax has defeated Ossie Duran, Matt Vanda, Andy Kolle, Phil Williams, Jonathan Reid,  Antwun Echols, Durrell Richardson, and James Crayton. His professional loss came to former undisputed middleweight world champion Jermain Taylor (Truax knocked Taylor down in the 9th round.)

Truax drew Ossie Duran in a 10-round non-title bout at the Target Center in Minneapolis. The bout was part of an eight-fight card promoted by Mike Tyson's new company, Iron Mike Productions. Mike Tyson was in attendance at the event, and said of Truax, "I hear he is exciting and he is something that we need for boxing, he is a breath of fresh air because boxing is in the doldrums right now. I'm looking forward to seeing him and if he is as much as everyone has told me."

WBA title bout
Truax faced Daniel Jacobs for the WBA (Regular) Middleweight title on April 24, 2015, and was stopped with 48 seconds left in the 12th and final round. A TKO loss. However Truax surprised the critics almost going the distance. The fight was broadcast on Spike TV as part of the Premier Boxing Champions

IBF World Super Middleweight title fight

On 9 December 2017, Truax fought British fighter James 'Chunky' DeGale at the Copper Box Arena in London, England, for Degale's IBF World Super Middleweight Title. Truax got off the mark the quickest and hit DeGale with several heavy shots throughout the fight. Although DeGale used his experience to come back into the fight in later rounds, it turned out to be too little too late. Truax showed great stamina and endurance to win the fight against the odds by Majority Decision, with scores of 116-112, 115-112 and 114-114 in favor of Truax. Although there was no re-match in the contract, DeGale immediately expressed his wish for a second fight upon losing.
Truax's victory was possibly one of the biggest boxing upsets of 2017, with both Bookmakers and Boxing Media heavily favoring DeGale pre-fight.

Truax vs DeGale II 
The rematch happened four months after, in Las Vegas. In what was a close and very competitive fight, Truax was overmatched by DeGale. The fight was full of clinches and headbutts, especially DeGale who got cut over his right eye, and was a bloody mess by the end of the fight. In the end, all three judges scored the fight in favor of DeGale, two of them scoring it 114-113 and one judge seeing a wider victory for DeGale, scoring the fight 117-100 in favor of DeGale.

On 13 April 2019, Truax fought Peter Quillin. The fight endend in a no-contest, because of an accidental head clash which caused a severe cut over Truax's right eye. After the fight, Truax stated that we was ready to continue, but the ringside physician made the final call.

In his next fight, Truax faced David Basajjamivule in his home state of Minnesota. Truax was more effective than his opponent during the fight, while Basajjamivule got a point deducted in two occasions, once for hitting Truax at the back of his head, and once for holding. Truax won the fight via majority-decision.

Professional boxing record

See also
List of super-middleweight boxing champions

References

External links

Caleb Truax profile from Premier Boxing Champions
Caleb Truax - Profile, News Archive & Current Rankings at Box.Live

   

1983 births
Living people
University of Minnesota College of Liberal Arts alumni
Boxers from Minnesota
Middleweight boxers
Super-middleweight boxers
World super-middleweight boxing champions
International Boxing Federation champions
American male boxers
People from Osseo, Minnesota
African-American boxers
21st-century African-American sportspeople
20th-century African-American people